Sir Peter Leslie Charles Barter  (26 March 1940 – 21 June 2022) was an Australian-born, naturalised Papua New Guinean businessman and politician based in the Madang Province, where he owned and operated the Madang Resort.

He was Governor of Madang from 1997 to 2002 where he served as Minister for Health and Bougainville Affairs in the Papua New Guinean Government and was active in the reconciliation movement in Bougainville. He established the Melanesian Foundation in 1980, a not-for-profit organisation that invests in remote communities that have been hospitable to tourists. 

He was born in Sydney and attended Newington College (1952–1955) before training as a commercial fixed-wing and helicopter pilot and flying for Qantas.

He was knighted in the 2001 New Year Honours, on the recommendation of the Papua New Guinea government.

Barter died in Cairns, Queensland, Australia at the age of 82 following a short illness.

References

External links

1940 births
2022 deaths
Governors of Madang Province
Members of the National Parliament of Papua New Guinea
Foreign Ministers of Papua New Guinea
Grand Companions of the Order of Logohu
Australian Officers of the Order of the British Empire
Australian Knights Bachelor
Australian politicians awarded knighthoods
Australian emigrants to Papua New Guinea
Papua New Guinean people of English descent
Australian people of English descent
People educated at Newington College
Politicians from Sydney
Businesspeople from Sydney